Sri Rangapuram (Nadigudem) is a village in Nadigudem mandal, suryapet district of Telangana. its located 18.8 km from Kodad town.

Economy 
The village is dependent on cultivation like other villages in Telangana. It is a beautiful farming village with paddy fields, mango groves and other fruit plantations. The Nagarjuna Sagar Dam left canal is the main source for water. The people are mainly engaged in agriculture, horticulture and dairying.

Demographics 
There are around 500 families living in this village. Most of the families hold land of less than 1.5 hectares. The village has a mix of population of Kamma, Vysya, Telaga, Dudekula, Gowda, Yadava, Viswakarma, and Madiga communities. The Madiga community constitutes the majority of the population with extremely poor economic conditions.

Education 
The village has a primary school with four classrooms. It is the nerve center of the village concentrating on education.  A number of children have emerged from this school to become graduates and post graduates. They went into professions as doctors, engineers, scientists, teachers and business. Several of them have pursued education in the United States of America and have settled abroad (US, Europe, UAE, different zones of Asian region and elsewhere). Many have settled in their respective professions in all major cities of India as doctors, teachers, lawyers, engineers, businessmen and as skilled professionals. Most of the families pursue education as a means for better living standards.

References 
Villages in Nalgonda district